Moturu Udayam (13 October 1924 – 31 March 2002) was an Indian politician and women's rights activist. She was the General Secretary of the Andhra Pradesh Mahila Sangham for eighteen years, and then the honorary president of the organisation between 1992 and 2001. She was also Vice President of the All India Democratic Women's Association, to which the APMS is affiliated, between 1981 and 2001.

Udayam was born in Turumella village, Guntur district. she came from a family of communist sympathizers in Turumella village. She was married to the communist leader Moturi Hanumantha Rao. Along with her husband, she lived underground during the periods of 1940-1945 and 1949-1951. During these periods she led the first all-female Burrakatha cultural group, a vehicle for anti-fascist campaign activities. She was also known in Andhra Pradesh as the first woman to ride a bicycle in the state.

When the Communist Party of India was split in 1964, she sided with the Communist Party of India (Marxist). During the Emergency, she again went underground to escape repression. She died in Vijayawada.


Legacy
After her death, the Moturu Udayam Trust was set up in her memory. Mallu Swarajyam, who had built up the APMS alongside Udayam, is its managing trustee.

Bibliography
Udayam's life story is detailed, along with testimonies from eleven other women activists, in the book Breaking Barriers, Stories of Twelve Women.

Udayam was author of publications such as Kangrasupalana pratibimbame mahilala ki adhogati, Mahilala badhamaya jivita gunde cappullu: Adugaduguna vyathalu-visada gathalu and Mahilalaku himsala nundi vimukti eppudu?.

References

1924 births
2002 deaths
Communist Party of India (Marxist) politicians from Andhra Pradesh
People from Guntur district